Xiong Yan (born 1 September 1964) is a Chinese-American human rights activist, military officer, and Protestant chaplain. He was a dissident involved in 1989 Tiananmen Square protests. Xiong Yan studied at Peking University Law School from 1986–1989. He came to the United States of America as a political refugee in 1992, and later became a chaplain in U.S. Army, serving in Iraq. Xiong Yan is the author of three books, and has earned six degrees. He ran for Congress in New York's 10th congressional district in 2022, and his campaign was reportedly attacked by agents of Communist China's Ministry of State Security.

Dissident
Growing up in Hunan, he moved to Beijing to pursue graduate level studies in law at Peking University. He was a probationary member of the Chinese Communist Party.   While at Peking University, he was a member of Caodi Salon, which Liu Gang had organized.

Yan was a student leader during the Tiananmen Square protests of 1989. At one point, he called himself "general commander". After the crackdown at Tiananmen Square, he was placed on China's most wanted list. Captured in late June 1989 at Datong, he was returned to Beijing under armed guard of hundreds of soldiers. Afterwards, he was detained for 19 months at maximum security Qincheng Prison without being charged with a crime.

After his release, Yan's academic credentials were stripped from him, and he was unable to obtain identification. During this period he converted to Christianity having met a member of an underground church. He fled mainland China in May 1992. After being granted political asylum he moved to the United States in June 1992, initially moving to the Los Angeles area. He remains a fugitive of mainland China.

After leaving China
Moving to Boston, he studied English at Harvard University and was accepted into its divinity school but declined its admission. He later attended Gordon–Conwell Theological Seminary; eventually he earned a D.Min. degree from the same seminary in 2009. He is active in the overseas China democracy movement. In 2009, he made a trip to Hong Kong to attend a candlelight vigil on the June 4 anniversary of the Tiananmen crackdown. It was estimated that 150,000 people attended the vigil. This was the first time, within a 17-year time span, for Yan to return to China since 1992.

In 2010, Chai Ling and he were panel members at a discussion on China's One-child policy held at Rayburn House Office Building.

In 2015, after receiving word that his mother's health was failing, Yan appealed to mainland China to be allowed to return to see her before she dies; he was detained when trying to cross into China from Hong Kong, and was unable to see her before she died. In 2017, when a United Kingdom diplomatic cable was declassified, which estimated that about 10,000 civilians were killed, Xiong agreed with the account.

Military service
Yan went on to join the United States Army while working on a second bachelor's degree, studying at the University of North Carolina. He graduated with a B.A. in English Literature in 1998. By 1999, he was a sergeant in the Army Reserve. He went on to earn an M.A. degree from the Covenant Theological Seminary in 2001 and a Master of Arts in Religion (M.A.R.) degree from Trinity Evangelical Divinity School in 2002. Serving eight years in the Army Reserve, he was commissioned as an officer in 2003. He serves as a Protestant chaplain of the Evangelical Church Alliance denomination. In 2010, he was a chaplain at the Warrant Officer Career College on Fort Rucker. In 2014, Yan was stationed at Fort Bliss.

Yan served two tours in Iraq. Xiong has considered running for Congress in the future, after he retires from the Army. In 2017, Xiong was stationed in Hawaii.

Congressional campaign 
He is running for Congress in New York's 10th congressional district as a Democrat. The United States Department of Justice has reported that his campaign has been attacked by agents of China's Ministry of State Security, including surveillance, and discussion of possible smear campaigns, honey trapping and physical attacks.

Personal life
Xiong is married to Qian Liyun. She was arrested along with Shen Tong due to activity relating to the Democracy for China Fund in 1992; they were released and sent to the United States. In the United States, Liyun also joined the Army.

See also
Human Rights in China
Laogai

References

Further reading

External links

1964 births
Living people
American military personnel of Chinese descent
United States Army personnel of the Iraq War
Candidates in the 2022 United States House of Representatives elections
Chinese dissidents
Chinese emigrants to the United States
Chinese human rights activists
Peking University alumni
Chinese Christians
Writers from Hunan
American evangelicals
University of North Carolina alumni
Covenant Theological Seminary alumni
Trinity Evangelical Divinity School alumni
United States Army chaplains
Gordon–Conwell Theological Seminary alumni
People from Loudi
People from Shuangfeng County
Converts to Christianity